Shoaib Khan (born 13 April 1985) is a left-handed Pakistani batsman who played for Quetta Bears and played four international Twenty20 matches for Pakistan in the Al-Barkah Twenty20 Tournament. He averages 16.25 with the bat with the strike rate of 81 in International Twenty20. In February 2021, he began to undertake coaching courses with the Pakistan Cricket Board.

References

1985 births
Living people
Baluchistan cricketers
Pakistani cricketers
Pakistan Twenty20 International cricketers
Quetta cricketers
People from Pishin District
Baluchistan Bears cricketers
Quetta Bears cricketers
Pashtun people